André Leif Nevstad (born 12 May 1972) is a retired Norwegian football midfielder.

He came through the youth ranks of Hødd, where he stayed his entire career, except for the seasons 1993 and 1994 in rivals Molde FK. At Molde, he became Norwegian Cup champion in 1994, appearing as an 86th minute substitute in the 1994 Norwegian Football Cup Final. He was capped for Norway at under-21 level. Most of all, he became a club legend in Hødd, recording a total of 683 matches across all competitions.

Nevstad was hired in the IL Hødd administration in 1996, and worked there continuously until 2019, when he resigned as director of sports. He is married and has three children. In 2020 he replaced Kenneth W. Karlsen as managing director of Mjøndalen IF.

References

1972 births
Living people
People from Ulstein
Norwegian footballers
IL Hødd players
Molde FK players
Norwegian First Division players
Eliteserien players
Association football midfielders
Norway under-21 international footballers
IL Hødd non-playing staff
Mjøndalen IF non-playing staff
Sportspeople from Møre og Romsdal